Sandpit is a small village in the rural hinterland of Drogheda, County Louth, Ireland.

Location
Sandpit is located about four miles north of Drogheda, off the road to Termonfeckin.  It lies in the townland of Milltown between the M1 motorway and the coast, where there are extensive beaches and golf courses at Baltray and Seapoint.  The village has been growing as a location for people working in Drogheda.

Features
There is a 19th-century church, the Church of the Assumption, a primary school, a small supermarket and a community hall which houses a playschool and is used by many local clubs and organisations.  

Notable local properties include the Georgian Sandpit House.

See also
 List of towns and villages in Ireland

Towns and villages in County Louth

Articles on towns and villages in Ireland possibly missing Irish place names